Eoin Toal (born 15 February 1999) is a Northern Irish professional footballer who plays for Bolton Wanderers, as a defender.

Early and personal life
Toal was born in Armagh. One of his uncles, Peter Rafferty, and one of his cousins, Ethan Rafferty, played for Armagh in Gaelic football. Peter later managed Armagh U21 to All-Ireland glory in 2004. Eoin himself played Gaelic football until the age of 14, deciding instead to switch to association football. Another uncle, Mickey Toal, and another cousin, Thomas Mackle, played Irish road bowling with Mickey considered a legend in the sport whilst Thomas has won the All-Ireland Championship.

Club career
Toal began his career with Armagh City, captaining the youth team and making his first-team debut in 2015 aged 16, making over 50 appearances for the club in all competitions, before moving to Derry City in 2017. He served as club captain for Derry City, making 155 appearances for the club in all competitions. He started and played in the 2019 League of Ireland Cup Final, and even converted one of the penalties in the penalty shootout, but it wasn't enough as they lost to Dundalk.

Toal signed for Bolton Wanderers in July 2022 on a three-year contract.

Toal picked up an ankle injury towards the end of his time at Derry, choosing to play through the injury as he did not want to miss their matches in the UEFA Europa Conference League against Riga. In doing so, he worsened the injury which caused him to miss Bolton's pre-season, as well as the start of their season. Upon his return from injury, he played for Bolton's B team to build up match fitness. He then stepped up his recovery by playing matches in the EFL Trophy. After more matches for the B team, as well as the EFL Trophy, Toal made his Football League debut on 2 December 2022 in a 1–1 draw against Bristol Rovers, with Toal being praised for his performance. Three weeks later he scored his first Bolton goal, scoring the equaliser in a 1–1 draw with Lincoln City. He received praise from his team mates for how well he had played during the start of his Bolton career and was named Bolton Player of the Month for December 2022.

International career
Toal first played international football with the Northern Ireland under-15 team. He later played three times for the under-17 team in 2015, three times for the under-19 team in 2017, and 13 times for the under-21 team between 2019 and 2020. He scored one goal during this time, on 7 October 2017 in a 7–1 defeat against Germany under-19. He captained the under-21 team on multiple occasions.

On 7 March 2023, he received his first call-up to the Northern Irish senior national team by manager Michael O'Neill, for the UEFA Euro 2024 qualifying matches against San Marino and Finland.

Career statistics

Honours
Derry City
League of Ireland Cup runner-up: 2019

References

2000 births
Living people
Association footballers from Northern Ireland
Northern Ireland under-21 international footballers
Armagh City F.C. players
Derry City F.C. players
Bolton Wanderers F.C. players
Association football defenders
League of Ireland players
English Football League players